Ginoria nudiflora is a species of plant in the family Lythraceae. It is endemic to Mexico.

References

Endemic flora of Mexico
nudiflora
Vulnerable plants
Taxonomy articles created by Polbot